Electricity detection may refer to:
Electroreception and electrogenesis by animals
The field of electrophysiology,  measurement and recording of electrophysiological activity in the body

See also
 electrography (disambiguation)
 galvanometer